Deo Fort is a fort situated in Aurangabad district, Bihar near the town of Deo. It was commanded by the rulers of Deo Raj who were Sisodia Rajputs who originated by Mewar. The fort is located next to Deo Sun Temple and faces northwards.

The last king of Deo Maharaja Jagnath Singh, he had two sons. The last Raja, Jagannath Prasad Singh died on 16 April 1934, younger Queen took charge after his death and ruled up to 1947.

See also
 Deo Raj
 Deo, Bihar

References

Buildings and structures in Bihar
Deo, Bihar
Forts in Bihar